Smith's was a Belgian professional cycling team that existed from 1966 to 1968. Its co-sponsor for the first two seasons and sole sponsor for the final season was the British company Smith's Potato Crisps.

References

External links

Cycling teams based in Belgium
Defunct cycling teams based in Belgium
1966 establishments in Belgium
1968 disestablishments in Belgium
Cycling teams established in 1966
Cycling teams disestablished in 1968